Zubair Khan (born 1 August 1963) is an Indian politician of the Indian National Congress political party. Zubair Khan is the current Secretary of the All India Congress Committee and the Party In-Charge of Uttar Pradesh. He assumed this position on 17 June 2013. Formerly, Zubair Khan was elected as the Member of Legislative Assembly for Rajasthan on three instances, in 1990, when he became one of the youngest MLA in India at 26 years, 1993 and 2003.

Khan has served as the Chief Whip of Congress Legislative Party in Rajasthan Assembly during 2003 to 2008. He was also elected as the President of Jamia Millia Islamia Student Union twice on NSUI banner. Zubair Khan belongs to a Traditional Congress and Farmer family.

Early life and education
Zubair Khan was born into a farmer family in machri umrain rural  Alwar, Rajasthan. His father, Bagh Singh, was a Sarpanch for 38 years. Zubair Khan undertook his early schooling in a government primary school and his further schooling at Jamia Millia Islamia in New Delhi. At Jamia Millia Islamia, Khan's political career commenced and he served as the president of the university's NSUI unit and Student Union.

Career

Political career

Elected senior house Monitor of hostels of Jamia Millia Islamia University, New Delhi.
Elected as Gen. Secy. of Jamia Millia Islamia University Students' Union (JMISU)
Elected (unopposed) as the chairman of constitute assembly for JMISU constitution.
Elected as the president of JMISU on National student of India (NSUI) banner.
Appointed as the president of Jamia University NSUI unit.
Again elected as the president of JMISU on NSUI banner.
Elected as MLA from 67- Ramgarh Constituency (Rajasthan) on Indian National Congress (INC) ticket three times (1990, 1993 and 2003)
Was Dy. Chief Whip of CLP, Rajasthan (1993–98) and Chief Whip of CLP (2003–08)
Was Elected District Congress Committee President of Alwar District, Rajasthan (2000-2005)
Was General Secretary of Rajasthan Pradesh Congress Committee (2011-2013) (In-Charge of Jaipur and Bharatpur)
Appointed as Secretary, All India Congress Committee in 2013 (In-Charge of Uttar Pradesh)

Organizational Background
Was Joint Secy. of All India NSUI
Was President of Rajasthan State NSUI
Was Vice President of All India NSUI
Was Joint Secy. and Organising Secy. of Rajasthan PCC
Was Gen. Secretary of IYC (During Mr. Manish Tewari's Tenure)
Was Political Advisor to IYC President, Mr. Randeep Surjewala
Was Elected as the President of DCC Alwar (Rajasthan)
PRO, Sikkim State for Org. Elections - 2010 
Was Appointed AICC observer for Uttar Pradesh Assembly Elections 2012.
AICC Member Since 2000
Member Of National Service Scheme (NSS)

Personal life
Zubair Khan married Shafia Zubair on 27 December 1991. Shafia Zubair is the current MLA from Ramgarh Alwar Rajasthan 30-01-2019. Shafia Zubair is the ex Zila Parishad Chairperson of the Alwar District. Shafia Zubair's father, Maj. Mohammad Usman, served in the Indian Army. Zubair Khan and his wife have two sons, Adil Zubair (b. 17 June 1993) and Aryan Zubair (b. 27 November 1996).

References

1963 births
Indian National Congress politicians from Rajasthan
Living people
People from Alwar
Rajasthan MLAs 1990–1992
Rajasthan MLAs 1993–1998
Rajasthan MLAs 2003–2008